Concert pitch is the pitch reference to which a group of musical instruments are tuned for a performance. Concert pitch may vary from ensemble to ensemble, and has varied widely over music history. The most common modern tuning standard uses 440 Hz for A above middle C as a reference note, with other notes being set relative to it. In the literature this is also called international standard pitch.

The term "concert pitch" is also used to distinguish between the "written" (or "nominal"), and "sounding" (or "real") notes of a transposing instrument, i.e. concert pitch may refer to the sounding pitch on a non-transposing instrument. Music for transposing instruments is transposed into different keys from that of non-transposing instruments. For example, playing a written C on a B clarinet or trumpet produces a non-transposing instrument's B. This pitch is referred to as "concert B".

Modern standard concert pitch

The A above middle C is often set at 440 Hz. Historically, this A has been tuned to a variety of higher and lower pitches.

History of pitch standards in Western music
Historically, various standards have been used to fix the pitch of notes at certain frequencies. Various systems of musical tuning have also been used to determine the relative frequency of notes in a scale.

Pre-19th century
Until the 19th century, there was no coordinated effort to standardize musical pitch, and the levels across Europe varied widely. Pitches did not just vary from place to place, or over time—pitch levels could vary even within the same city. The pitch used for an English cathedral organ in the 17th century, for example, could be as much as five semitones lower than that used for a domestic keyboard instrument in the same city.

Even within one church, the pitch used could vary over time because of the way organs were tuned. Generally, the end of an organ pipe would be hammered inwards to a cone, or flared outwards, to raise or lower the pitch. When the pipe ends became frayed by this constant process they were all trimmed down, thus raising the overall pitch of the organ.

From the early 18th century, pitch could also be controlled with the use of tuning forks (invented in 1711), although again there was variation. For example, a tuning fork associated with Handel, dating from 1740, is pitched at A =  while a later one from 1780 is pitched at A =  about a quarter-tone lower. A tuning fork that belonged to Ludwig van Beethoven around 1800, now in the British Library, is pitched at A = , well over a half-tone higher.

The frequencies quoted here are based on modern measurements and would not have been precisely known to musicians of the day. Although Mersenne had made a rough determination of sound frequencies as early as the 17th century, such measurements did not become scientifically accurate until the 19th century, beginning with the work of German physicist Johann Scheibler in the 1830s. The term formerly used for the unit of pitch, cycle per second (CPS) was renamed the hertz (Hz) in the 20th century in honor of Heinrich Hertz.

Pitch inflation
During historical periods when instrumental music rose in prominence (relative to the voice), there was a continuous tendency for pitch levels to rise. This "pitch inflation" seemed largely a product of instrumentalists competing with each other, each attempting to produce a brighter, more "brilliant", sound than that of their rivals. On at least two occasions, pitch inflation had become so severe that reform became needed. At the beginning of the 17th century, Michael Praetorius reported in his encyclopedic Syntagma musicum that pitch levels had become so high that singers were experiencing severe throat strain and lutenists and viol players were complaining of snapped strings. The standard voice ranges he cites show that the pitch level of his time, at least in the part of Germany where he lived, was at least a minor third higher than today's. Solutions to this problem were sporadic and local, but generally involved the establishment of separate standards for voice and organ and for chamber ensembles. Where the two were combined, as for example in a cantata, the singers and instrumentalists might perform from music written in different keys. This system kept pitch inflation at bay for some two centuries.

Concert pitch rose further in the 19th century as may be seen reflected in the tuning forks of France. The pipe organ tuning fork in Versailles Chapel in 1795 is 390 Hz, but in the Paris Opera an 1810 tuning fork gives A = 423 Hz, an 1822 fork gives A = 432 Hz, and an 1855 fork gives A = 449 Hz.

19th- and 20th-century standards

The strongest opponents of the upward tendency in pitch were singers, who complained that it was putting a strain on their voices. Largely due to their protests, the French government passed a law on February 16, 1859, which set the A above middle C at 435 Hz. This was the first attempt to standardize pitch on such a scale, and was known as the diapason normal. It became quite a popular pitch standard outside France as well, and has also been known at various times as French pitch, continental pitch or international pitch (the last of these not to be confused with the 1939 "international standard pitch" described below). An 1885 conference in Vienna established this value among Italy, Austria, Hungary, Russia, Prussia, Saxony, Sweden and Württemberg.

The appeal of this system is its mathematical idealism (the frequencies of all the Cs being powers of two). This system never received the same official recognition as the French A = 435 Hz and has not been widely used. This tuning has been promoted unsuccessfully by the LaRouche movement's Schiller Institute under the name Verdi tuning since Italian composer Giuseppe Verdi had proposed a slight lowering of the French tuning system. However, the Schiller Institute's recommended tuning for A of 432 Hz is for the Pythagorean ratio of 27:16, rather than the logarithmic ratio of equal temperament tuning.

British attempts at standardisation in the 19th century gave rise to the old philharmonic pitch standard of about A = 452 Hz (different sources quote slightly different values), replaced in 1896 by the considerably "deflated" new philharmonic pitch at A = 439 Hz. The high pitch was maintained by Sir Michael Costa for the Crystal Palace Handel Festivals, causing the withdrawal of the principal tenor Sims Reeves in 1877, though at singers' insistence the Birmingham Festival pitch was lowered (and the organ retuned) at that time. At the Queen's Hall in London, the establishment of the diapason normal for the Promenade Concerts in 1895 (and retuning of the organ to A = 435.5 at 15 °C (59 °F), to be in tune with A = 439 in a heated hall) caused the Royal Philharmonic Society and others (including the Bach Choir, and the Felix Mottl and Arthur Nikisch concerts) to adopt the continental pitch thereafter.

In England the term low pitch was used from 1896 onward to refer to the new Philharmonic Society tuning standard of A = 439 Hz at 68 °F, while "high pitch" was used for the older tuning of A = 452.4 Hz at 60 °F. Although the larger London orchestras were quick to conform to the new, low pitch, provincial orchestras continued using the high pitch until at least the 1920s, and most brass bands were still using the high pitch in the mid-1960s. Highland pipe bands continue to use an even sharper tuning, around A = 470–480 Hz, over a semitone higher than A440. As a result, bagpipes are often perceived as playing in B despite being notated in A (as if they were transposing instruments in D-flat), and are often tuned to match B brass instruments when the two are required to play together.

The Stuttgart Conference of the Society of German Natural Scientists and Physicians in 1834 recommended C264 (A440) as the standard pitch based on Scheibler's studies with his Tonometer. For this reason A440 has been referred to as Stuttgart pitch or Scheibler pitch.

In 1939, an international conference recommended that the A above middle C be tuned to 440 Hz, now known as concert pitch. As a technical standard this was taken up by the International Organization for Standardization in 1955 and reaffirmed by them in 1975 as ISO 16. The difference between this and the diapason normal is due to confusion over the temperature at which the French standard should be measured. The initial standard was A = , but this was superseded by A = 440 Hz, possibly because 439 Hz was difficult to reproduce in a laboratory since 439 is a prime number.

Current concert pitches
The most common standard around the world is currently A = 440 Hz.

In practice most orchestras tune to a note given out by the oboe, and most oboists use an electronic tuning device when playing the tuning note. Some orchestras tune using an electronic tone generator. When playing with fixed-pitch instruments such as the piano, the orchestra will generally tune to them—a piano will normally have been tuned to the orchestra's normal pitch. Overall, it is thought that the general trend since the middle of the 20th century has been for standard pitch to rise, though it has been rising far more slowly than it has in the past. Some orchestras like the Berlin Philharmonic now use a slightly lower pitch (443 Hz) than their highest previous standard (445 Hz).

Many modern ensembles which specialize in the performance of Baroque music have agreed on a standard of A = 415 Hz. An exact equal-tempered semitone lower than 440 Hz would be 415.305 Hz, though this is rounded to the nearest integer for simplicity and convenience. In principle this allows for playing along with modern fixed-pitch instruments if their parts are transposed down a semitone.

Orchestras in Cuba typically use A436 as the pitch so that strings, which are difficult to obtain, last longer. In 2015 American pianist Simone Dinnerstein brought attention to this issue and later traveled to Cuba with strings donated by friends.

Controversial claims for 432 Hz 
Particularly in the beginning of the 21st century, many websites and online videos have been published arguing for the adoption of the 432 Hz tuning – often referred to as "Verdi pitch" – instead of the predominant 440 Hz. These claims also include conspiracy theories, related to claims of specious healing properties from 432 Hz pitch, or involving Nazis having favored the 440 Hz tuning.

References

Pitch (music)